Hồ Ngọc Thắng (born 10 February 1994) is a Vietnamese footballer who plays as a midfielder for V.League 2 club Phú Thọ.

Honours

Club
 V.League 1 runner-up: 2013
 Vietnamese Cup runner-up: 2013

International
Vietnam U23
 Bronze medal: Southeast Asian Games: 2015

References 

1994 births
Living people
Vietnamese footballers
Association football midfielders
V.League 1 players
SHB Da Nang FC players
Footballers at the 2014 Asian Games
Saigon FC players
Southeast Asian Games bronze medalists for Vietnam
Southeast Asian Games medalists in football
Competitors at the 2015 Southeast Asian Games
Asian Games competitors for Vietnam